Erik Voake is an American filmmaker and photographer born in Yorba Linda, California in 1973.

Education

Voake attended Western State College of Colorado where he studied Outdoor Leadership. He lived in the town of Crested Butte, CO.

He purchased an Arriflex 16mm motion picture camera and focused on whitewater kayaking. After traveling to Peru, West Virginia and all through Colorado he put together his first action sports documentary titled The Fix.  While in production on Off the Deep End Voake began co-creating his next action sports film series titled Slednecks. Slednecks is an action sports film that focuses on the sport of freestyle snowmobiling and is now one of the biggest draws of the winter X Games on ESPN. While making Slednecks Voake was introduced to fellow action sports filmmakers  and, creators of the highest selling action sports film series to date, Crusty Demons of Dirt. He went on to segment produce, film and edit 5 Crusty Demons of Dirt films.

Voake befriended Zalman King, creator of 9 ½ Weeks, which led to him producing, directing, filming and editing the definitive documentary on the controversial rap metal band "Body Count" featuring Ice-T. The film was titled Murder For Hire and included some of the last performance footage of guitarist "D Roc the Executioner."

He directed two music videos for  the first was titled "Chamber of Fear" and was used by Nike to promote the LeBron James shoe.  The second music video titled "Unleash Me" was used to promote the Jet Li film Unleashed and was also the title track for the film.

Voake was a Producer and the Director of Photography on the first ever hip hop era feature film titled A Day in the Life. The film was directed by Sticky Fingaz and starred Omar Epps, Michael Rapaport, Mekhi Phifer, Drina De Niro, Faizon Love and Bokeem Woodbine. The film was distributed by Lions Gate.

Voake produces and works as a Director of Photography for Larry Clark, director of the film Kids. Their film "Impaled" was part of the Destricted film series was screened at the Sundance, Cannes and Locarno film festivals. It was also screened at the Tate Modern Museum in London. It is a documentary about the impact of pornography on kid’s sex lives.

In 2007 Voake created and sold a reality show based on the Crusty Demons of Dirt films he helped make to FUSE Networks. The show, Crusty’s Dirt Demons was the highest rated new show if its debut season and went on to air for two full seasons.

From 2008 – 2009 Voake focused on a photography project involving Roxy Theatre on the Sunset Strip. His photo of the band "Chelsea Girls" launched his career with SPIN Magazine. He also lists such notable clients as Rolling Stone, Billboard, Red Bull, HARD Events and Porter Robinson. Voake has photographed a number of high-profile musicians and actors, President Obama and Noam Chomsky. He is currently working on a book involving the photos he took from the Roxy Theatre. He has had a number of exhibits, including a recent exhibit curated by Danny Masterson and Rock Paper Photo, which is owned by Guy Oseary, and whom represents his prints.

2010-Current Voake has produced and directed a number of action sports documentaries, music videos that have appeared on MTV. He's noted as the Creator and Executive Producer of Crusty’s Dirt Demons on FUSE Networks, Co Producer and DP on “A Day in the Life” starring Omar Epps, Michael Rapaport, Mekhi Phiffer and more, the feature film is distributed by Lions Gate. Producer and DP for director Larry Clark (KIDS, Bully, Wussup Rockers), the film Impaled was screened at Sundance, Cannes and the Tate Modern in London.

Art Exhibitions 
 The Celebrity Vault of Beverly Hills
 Sunset Strip Music Festival 2010 and 2011
 Greytone Labs
 John Varvatos store in Malibu
 Confederacy in Los Angeles

References

 https://web.archive.org/web/20141020090114/http://blog.pocketwizard.com/2014/03/breaking-first-three-song-rule-erik-voake/
 http://www.magneticmag.com/tag/erik-voake/
 http://whitewatervideo.com/loaded.htm

External links
 https://web.archive.org/web/20141020090114/http://blog.pocketwizard.com/2014/03/breaking-first-three-song-rule-erik-voake/
 http://www.magneticmag.com/2012/01/capturing-a-moment-with-erik-voake/
 http://www.adorama.com/alc/0013238/article/concert-photography-tips-from-the-pit-1

American photographers
American film directors
Living people
Year of birth missing (living people)